Sello Enoch Dada Morero is a South African politician who served as the Mayor of Johannesburg since 30 September 2022 until 25 October 2022. His term of office has been for 25 days. Morero is the regional chairperson of the African National Congress in Johannesburg.

Political career
Morero is a former COSAS (Congress of the South African Students' Congress) student leader. He had previously served for two terms as the regional secretary of the African National Congress in Johannesburg. On 5 June 2022, Morero defeated deputy regional chairperson Eunice Mgcina to become the next regional chairperson of the ANC, winning with 153 votes to Mgcina's 143 votes.

Following the implosion of the DA-led coalition government in the City of Johannesburg and the subsequent removal of DA mayor Mpho Phalatse in a vote of no confidence, Morero was elected mayor unanimously on 30 September 2022. He was elected with the help of the DA's former coalition partners, the Patriotic Alliance and the Congress of the People. He was sworn into office the following day.

References

Living people
Year of birth missing (living people)
Place of birth missing (living people)
African National Congress politicians
Mayors of Johannesburg
21st-century South African politicians